Per Adolf Lindskog (1751–1836) was a notable businessman and shipbuilder in Jakobstad at the turn of the 19th century. He was married to Anna Catharina Malm, the daughter of the prominent merchant and shipbuilder Niclas Malm. When his father-in-law Niclas Malm died in 1785, Adolf Lindskog took over the management of the city's twist tobacco factory.

Trade started to develop rapidly in Jakobstad as of 1765, when the cities along the Finnish shore of the Gulf of Botnia were granted privileges by the Swedish crown to trade directly with foreign countries, and Jakobstad became one of the wealthiest cities per capita in Finland. This also meant brisk business for Lindskog, and he was periodically the city's wealthiest man, competing with his brother-in-law Pehr Malm for this title.

In 1797 Adolf Lindskog had built the city's first house built of stone at the market square (it is today Jakobstad's oldest house). The same year, he founded a shipyard, with the intention to concentrate all ship building in Jakobstad to the same location.  This shipyard was built on Calholmen, and was named Calholmens skeppsvarv (the shipyard of Calholmen). This area is today called Varvet. During a period of 75 years, around 150 ships were built at this shipyard.

Finnish businesspeople
People from Jakobstad
1751 births
1836 deaths
Swedish-speaking Finns